Radha Paudel is a Nepalese nurse, activist and writer. She won the Madan Puraskar for her memoir Khalangama Hamala. She has actively worked for raising awareness related to various women related issues.

Personal life 
She was born on 29 December 1973 in Mangalpur village in Chitwan district of Nepal to mother Ganga Maya Poudel and father Devi Prasad Paudel, and raised in Gauriganj, Chitwan. She put the fire on the pyre of her mother's dead body in 2009. She declared to donate her eyes in 1999 and her body to medical schools in 2016.

Career 
Her childhood experiences of discrimination, abuse, and violence encouraged her to speak in support of gender justice through her position as a humanitarian activist, nurse, and writer. She has survived years of menstrual restriction, abuse, violences and war. She dedicates her time to be a voice for those who have been silenced their entire lives, especially young girls and women in Nepal. Radha Paudel employs the three E's (Education, Empower, and Emancipate) visibly through her work.

She used the issues she faced personally to help others that are going through similar experiences. She conducted a study and led the campaign against sexual harassment in public transport in 2011. She intensively engaged and led the volunteers during devastating earthquake 2015 and led a movement against sexual abuse in Tribhuvan University 2011. She travelled areas around Nepal most affected by a six-month boarder blockade in 2015/2016 and initiated the campaign for meaningful dialogue for peace in Lalbandhi, Sarlahi, Saptari, Dhanusa, Parsa, Chitwan, and Kathmandu and continuously engaged in relief work for reoccurring floods in Saptari and Siraha in 2016 and 2017 respectively. She also oversees a bio-degradable sanitary pad factory. She worked with more than dozens of organizations as a lead, founder, executives, advisor. She worked as full time Founder/Chair from 2010 to 2016. Ms. Paudel started to work for the Radha Paudel Foundation in 2016. Founded by her niece Ms. Anupa Regmi, in her name dedicated to replicate and amplify Ms. Paudel's aspirations for humanity.

Inspired by challenges she faced throughout her life, she kicked off the global campaign for the Global South Coalition for Dignified Menstruation. She pioneered the movement for Dignified Menstruation (dignity during menstruation).

Education 
She was a Staff Nurse in Pokhara, Nepal as well as a Nurse specializing in Anaesthesiology. She worked 24-hour shifts for four years as an anaesthetic nurse, one out of the five total anaesthetic nurses at the time. She received a Bachelor in Community Health Nursing (2000), a Master in Health Education (2001) and a Master in Sociology (2003), all from Tribhuvan University in Nepal. And obtained a Master in Development Management from the Asian Institute of Management (2010) (AIM).

Publications 
An anecdote written by Radha Paudel, 2002's war memoir between the Nepali Government's army and Maoist insurgency called JUMLA: A Nurse's Story also known in Nepali as Khalangama Hamala (The Attack on Khalanga) where she nearly died. The book won the Madan Puraskar in 2014.

She wrote Shanti Ka Pailaharu, a poetry book as well as Dignified Menstruation is Everyone's Business, a book about the dozens of inhumane practices followed while menstruating. In this book, Radha Paudel attends to the fact that the assumptions believed are wrong in a book of fact and logic. She dedicated another towards Dignified Menstruation titled Apbaitra Ragat.

She has written opinion based editorials in national mainstream newspapers and continues to contribute to international books. She also founded two awards: the Miteri Ganga devi Peace Award 2014 (from Madan Purasakar) and the Miteri Gangadevi Scholarship Fund  2009– Gauriganj Secondary School Gauriganj, Chitwan.

Awards and recognition 
In 2020, she received a TripleA award from Asian Institute of Management. She also received the Madan Literature Prize (2014) for her book Khalangama Hamala, in which she was the third woman to attain the award. She also received the Youth Innovation award 2014 from the Nepali Government. Due to her persistent effort to build resilient communities, by quitting many high-position jobs including a permanent position in the Nepali government, she received the N-Peace award and Women Peace Maker (2012).

International Engagement 
She spoke for Universities across globe: Austria (Afro Asiatisches Institut, Universität Salzburg, FH Salzburg, Vienna University), Germany (ASTA, Osnabruck, Bremen), Philippines (Asian Institute of Management), United Kingdom (London School of Public Health and Hygiene, Cambridge, Oxford, Essex University, Liverpool University, BCoT, Cranbourne), United States (University of San Diego, San Diego State University, Fullerton University, Florida University, Community Colleges, and Cigna University) and spoke among more than three dozens of diaspora community in the US, UK, Norway, Germany, Austria, etc. She is also associated with global networks.

References

Nepali-language writers
Madan Puraskar winners
Living people
1973 births
21st-century Nepalese writers
21st-century Nepalese women writers
People of the Nepalese Civil War
Nepalese nurses